Vintage Guitars is a British manufacturer of electric and acoustic guitars and bass guitars founded in 1995. The Vintage brand is owned by UK musical instrument distributors John Hornby Skewes and Co. Ltd. (JHS), and is based in Garforth, Leeds.

History 
The first guitar series by Vintage called VC1 came out in 1995. In collaboration with Trevor Wilkinson (originator of Fret-King), Vintage's goal was to manufacture affordable but well-made vintage-looking guitars.

Instruments manufactured by Vintage have been used by notable rock, heavy metal and country musicians, including Scott Sharrard, Fred Mollin, Billy Sherwood, John Payne, Dave Colwell, Peter Baltes and Nick Kane. Paul Brett worked as a guitar designer for Vintage. The brand has collaborated with Joe Doe Guitars. Vintage has designed signature model guitars for Thomas Blug, Jerry Donahue, Tony Butler and Midge Ure.

In 2020, due to the brand's 25th anniversary, the "25th Anniversary Series" of V75, V6H and V100, which are considered Vintage's best-selling models, was released, limited to 100 pieces each. In 2022, JHS gifted a Vintage acoustic-electric guitar to a homeless Malvern Link busker who got his Yamaha guitar stolen.

Reception 
Matt McCracken of Guitar.com noted that "Vintage made its name mixing homegrown design ingenuity with overseas manufacturing to deliver impressive value for money." Dave Burrluck of MusicRadar in his review of Vintage VSA500 (based on Gibson ES-335) acknowledged the brand's "copy-cat status", but concluded that "the guitars might be slight in price but [...] they are far from generic guitar-shaped objects. For the asking price this semi is excellent as is and maybe with a few personalised tweaks could become a serious keeper."

See also 
 Fret-King

References

External links 

 

Guitar manufacturing companies
Companies established in the 1990s
Musical instrument manufacturing companies of the United Kingdom
Manufacturing companies based in Leeds